John William Grobschmidt (January 3, 1896 – September 6, 1939) was an American businessman and politician.

Biography
Born in South Milwaukee, Wisconsin, Grobschmidt went to South Milwaukee High School and Marquette Academy. He was in the insurance business. He was involved in the Republican Party and served on the Milwaukee County, Wisconsin  Republican Committee. Grobschmidt served in the Wisconsin State Assembly on the Wisconsin Progressive Party ticket from 1929 until his death from a stroke in Milwaukee, Wisconsin on September 6, 1939.

Notes

1896 births
1939 deaths
People from South Milwaukee, Wisconsin
Businesspeople from Wisconsin
Wisconsin Progressives (1924)
Republican Party members of the Wisconsin State Assembly
20th-century American politicians
20th-century American businesspeople